The Transportation Distinguished Service Medal was the highest decoration which could be bestowed by the Secretary of Transportation for exceptional service to the United States government in a position of great responsibility to a member of the United States Coast Guard. In 2003 it was replaced by the Homeland Security Distinguished Service Medal.

The Department of Transportation Distinguished Service Medal was established by  signed by President George H. W. Bush on December 7, 1992.  The decoration was awarded to any member of the Coast Guard who provided exceptionally meritorious service in a duty of great responsibility while assigned in the Department of Transportation, or in other activities under the responsibility of the Secretary of Transportation, either national or international, as may be assigned by the Secretary.

With the creation of the Department of Homeland Security in 2003 and transfer of the Coast Guard to it, the award was changed to become the Homeland Security Distinguished Service Medal, issued by the Secretary of Homeland Security.

See also 
Awards and decorations of the United States Coast Guard
Obsolete military awards of the United States

References 

Military awards and decorations of the United States
Establishments by United States executive order
Awards established in 1992
United States Department of Transportation
Recipients of the Transportation Distinguished Service Medal